Finster is a surname. Notable people with the surname include:

 Felix Finster, mathematician
 Howard Finster, folk artist
C.H. Arthur Finster, diplomat and genealogists

Fictional characters
Baby-Face Finster, a criminal disguised as a baby in the Merrie Melodies animated short film Baby Buggy Bunny
Finster, a villain in Mighty Morphin Power Rangers
Chuckie Finster, Chaz Finster, Kira Finster and Kimi Finster from the animated Nickelodeon TV series Rugrats and All Grown Up!
Lorraine Finster, Minnie Driver's character from the TV show Will & Grace
Miss Muriel P. Finster, assistant principal from the animated Disney TV series Recess
Irwin Finster, a villain in the video game Wasteland